This article is a list of United States Air Force aeromedical evacuation squadrons both active, inactive, and historical. An aeromedical evacuation squadron's purpose is to evacuate wounded military personnel and civilians from areas of danger to medical facilities with the use of military transport aircraft.

List

See also
 List of United States Air Force squadrons

References

Aeromedical evacuation
Aeromedical evacuation squadrons of the United States Air Force